Nikolay Sergeyevich Shatsky (Nicholas Shatski) ( in Moscow – August 1, 1960 in Moscow) was a Soviet geologist, an expert in tectonics of ancient platforms.

Shatsky Rise, an oceanic plateau in North Pacific is named after him.

Since 1982 the USSR Academy of Sciences/Russian Academy of Sciences has awarded the annual Shatsky Prize (:ru:Премия имени Н. С. Шатского) for achievements in tectonics.

Awards
1946: Stalin Prize
1958: Lenin Prize, for the composition of the tectonic map of the Soviet Union
 Order of Lenin (2)
 Order of the Red Banner of Labour
 Medals

References

1895 births
1960 deaths
Soviet geologists
Full Members of the USSR Academy of Sciences